Garineh (also Romanized as Garīneh and Gereyneh; also known as Gazīneh) is a village in Zeberkhan Rural District, Zeberkhan District, Nishapur County, Razavi Khorasan Province, Iran. At the 2006 census, its population was 1,725, in 514 families.

References 

Populated places in Nishapur County